The Voice Israel (Season 3)  is the third season of the reality show The Voice Israel, which focuses on finding the next Israeli pop star. It is hosted by Michael Aloni with coaches Shlomi Shabat, Sarit Hadad, Aviv Geffen and Mosh Ben-Ari. Elkana Marziano was declared the winner, with Tamar Amar as runner-up.

It is the first season of the Israeli version to be broadcast in 16:9 widescreen format.

Summary of competitors

Competitors' table
 – Winner
 – Runner-up
  – 3rd Place
 – 4th Place
  – Eliminated in the Live shows
 – Eliminated in Knockout rounds

The third season of The Voice Israel included two recent immigrants to Israel who had had successful musical careers in their own countries: the Australian-Israeli Ohad Rein, who performed in Australia as Old Man River and had several hit songs, and the French-Israeli Shirel Bitan, who had a long musical theatre career in France, and stated on the show that she had been approached by the producers of the French The Voice to serve as a mentor for that show, soon before she left for Israel.

The group of competitors also included Jessica Katz, a niece of Steven Spielberg. Another contestant, Misha Kirkilan, had competed (as "Michael Kirkilan") on Season 3 of the Ukrainian version of The Voice, Holos Krainy, in 2013, but did not make it past the blind auditions on the Israeli version.

Result Tables

The Blind Auditions: Episodes 1-9

Episode 1

The coaches performed "אנצל"  at the start of the show.

Episode 2

Episode 3

Episode 4

Episode 5

Episode 6

Episode 7

Episode 8

Episode 9

Battle Rounds: Episodes 10-14

This year's battle rounds featured a new "steal" twist. After each battle round the losing artist then pitched to the other three coaches on why they should join their team. It was then up to the coaches (who have a limited amount of time) to press their red button to steal the artist. They could press their button as many times as they liked but were only allowed to steal two artists. If more than one coach wanted to steal the same artist then it was up to the artist to decide which team to join.

Colour key

Episode 10

Episode 11

Episode 12

Episode 13

Episode 14

More Battles

Super Battle Rounds: Episodes 15-16

Each coach remain with nine artists at this stage. each coach in his/her turn chose threesome from that team, then the coach chose one artist to get a "fast pass" to the Knockout rounds, the remaining two artists battle with each other and the coach decide who won and advanced to the Knockout rounds. After this stage, each coach remains with six artists.

Colour key:

Episode 15

Episode 16

Knockout rounds

Top 24: Episodes 17-18

At this stage of the competition, each mentor chose the contestants from his team to move on to the Top 20. However, the others mentors had the opportunity to press their "My Voice" button while the fourth mentor's contestant was singing. A contestants who all the others mentors gave him "their voice" moved on automatically to the Top 20.

Sarit Team

Aviv Team

Mosh Team

Shlomi Team

Top 20: Episodes 19-20

At this stage of the competition, each mentor chose the contestants from his team to move on to the Top 16. However, the others mentors had the opportunity to press their "My Voice" button while the fourth mentor's contestant was singing. A contestants who all the others mentors gave him "their voice" moved on automatically to the Top 16.
Group performances: Aviv Team with Aviv Geffen and Matti Caspi ("מסתובב"); Mosh Team with Mosh Ben Ari ("כמו בחיים")

Mosh Team

Sarit Team

Shlomi Team

Aviv Team

Top 16: Episodes 21-22

At this stage of the competition, each mentor chose the contestants from his team to move on to the Live show. However, the others mentors had the opportunity to press their "My Voice" button while the fourth mentor's contestant was singing. A contestants who all the others mentors gave him "their voice" moved on automatically to the Live Shows. In addition to the previous stages in the live show, the coach can veto on the other coaches decision to press "My Voice" and the artist won't moved on automatically to the Live Shows.
Group performances: Shlomi Team with Shlomi Shabat ("רומי"); Sarit Team with Sarit Hadad ("תחזרי").

Mosh Team

Sarit Team

Shlomi Team

Aviv Team

Live Shows

At this stage, the audience decide which artist will advance to the next episode.

Colour key:

Episode 23

Episode 24: Arik Einstein's songs

Episode 25: Unplugged

Episode 26

Episode 27: Quarter Finals

In this episode, the artists sang duet with the graduates of the previous seasons of The Voice.

Colour key:

Episode 28: Semi Finals
Musical guest: Lina Makhul ("אנתה")

Episode 29: The Final
Group performances: The Voice Israel Final Four ("מישהו שומע אותי"); Yarden Peretz & Ruma Amar with Shlomi Shabat ("לא מגלה"); The Voice Israel Top 24 ("תם ולא נשלם")

References

External links
 The Voice Israel Official website

The Voice Israel seasons
2014 Israeli television seasons